Marcos Antônio Nascimento Santos (born 11 June 1988), commonly known as Marcos Antônio, is a Brazilian professional footballer who plays as a midfielder  for Taubaté.

Career
Marcos Antônio was born in Maceió. In August 2009, he joined 2. Bundesliga club TSV 1860 Munich on a one-year loan from Brazilian club Corinthians Alagoano and he wore number three in his new club.

References

1988 births
Living people
Brazilian footballers
Brazilian expatriate footballers
Centro Sportivo Alagoano players
Sociedade Esportiva do Gama players
TSV 1860 Munich players
America Football Club (RJ) players
Kashiwa Reysol players
Itumbiara Esporte Clube players
Agremiação Sportiva Arapiraquense players
Boa Esporte Clube players
Clube de Regatas Brasil players
Associação Atlética Santa Rita players
Atlético Clube Goianiense players
FC Anyang players
Paysandu Sport Club players
Esporte Clube Taubaté players
J2 League players
Campeonato Brasileiro Série B players
Campeonato Brasileiro Série C players
Campeonato Brasileiro Série D players
2. Bundesliga players
K League 2 players
Association football midfielders
Association football defenders
Brazilian expatriate sportspeople in Japan
Brazilian expatriate sportspeople in Germany
Brazilian expatriate sportspeople in South Korea
Expatriate footballers in Japan
Expatriate footballers in Germany
Expatriate footballers in South Korea
People from Maceió
Sportspeople from Alagoas